Fasa Airport  is an airport serving Fasa, a city in the Fars Province in Iran.

Facilities

References

External links
 

Airports in Iran
Transportation in Fars Province
Buildings and structures in Fars Province